The Steese Highway (known as the Steese Expressway within Fairbanks) is a highway in the Interior region of the U.S. state of Alaska that extends  from Fairbanks to Circle, a town on the Yukon River about 50 miles (80 km) south of the Arctic Circle.  The highway was completed in 1927 and is named for U.S. Army General James G. Steese, a former president of the Alaska Road Commission. It is paved for about the first  and around the town of Central it turns to dirt and gravel.  Much of it is narrow and winding.

History

The highway and surrounding region has a long association with gold mining. It was built to service the Circle Mining District, which was very productive in the 1890s, before the discovery of gold in the Klondike. Both historic sites, such as Felix Pedro's 1902 gold discovery which resulted in the founding of Fairbanks, and the preserved gold camp at Chatanika, and active dredging operations line the road.

Route description

The Steese Highway is numbered Alaska Route 6 for most of its length, except for the first 11 miles (17 km) from Fairbanks to Fox, which are numbered Alaska Route 2. The highway has been designated as a National Scenic Byway.

There are three possible road closure barriers, so 511 Alaska should be checked before traveling its length to Circle Alaska.

Major Intersections

References

Transportation in Fairbanks North Star Borough, Alaska
State highways in Alaska
Yukon–Koyukuk Census Area, Alaska
Transportation in Unorganized Borough, Alaska